Noor el-Sheikh (born April 3, 1987) is a Bahraini broadcaster and actress.

Biography
Her father is the Bahraini singer, Khaled El Sheikh, and she has five sisters, Lama, Darren, Marwa, Samawa, and Ness. She holds a Bachelor of Arts degree in International Fashion Marketing from the University of Manchester. After graduation, she worked at a British fashion and cosmetics company.

Personal life
In July 2018, El-Sheikh married Bahraini media personality Khaled Al Shaer.

Career
El-Sheikh began her media career when the producers of Hala Bahrain, the morning show on Bahrain TV produced by Charisma Group, hired her to film a report on thrifty shopping at trendy boutiques in 2010. Afterwards, Bilal al-Arabi, then the show's main editor, invited her to join the reporting team, for which she regularly contributed and appeared three times a week as a fashion critic. After a year, the contract with Charisma was severed, but Bahrain TV asked her to take over as host, which she accepted immediately. She completed a course with veteran journalist Ghassan bin Jiddo at the Al-Jazeera media training center, then co-hosted a show for two episodes on Kuwait’s Al-Watan TV station with Bader Mohamed. She made her acting debut in the 2018 series El-Khtaya El-Ashr.

Filmography

Television series

Unscripted programs

External links
 El Cinema page

References

1987 births
Bahraini television actresses
Bahraini television presenters
Alumni of the University of Manchester
Living people